This is the list of rulers of Morocco, since the establishment of the state in 789. The common and formal titles of these rulers has varied, depending on the time period. Since 1957, the designation King has been used.

The present King of Morocco is Mohammed VI of the 'Alawi dynasty, since 23 July 1999.

Idrisid dynasty

Almoravid dynasty

Almohad dynasty

Marinid dynasty

Idrisid interlude
Muhammad ibn Ali Idrisi-Joutey (1465 – 1471)

Wattasid dynasty

Saadi dynasty

Dila'i interlude
Muhammad al-Hajj ad-Dila'i (1659 – 1663)

'Alawi dynasty
1631 – 1957: 'Alawi sultans of Morocco

1957 – present: 'Alawi kings of Morocco

Royal Standard

See also
fr:Liste des souverains de la dynastie Alaouite
Succession to the Moroccan throne
History of Morocco
Politics of Morocco

References

 
 
Rulers
Rulers
Rulers
Morocco
Morocco